Raymond Zarpanelian (born 17 May 1933 in Paris, France; died 29 March 2011 in Paris, France) was an Armenian-French football coach who was last known to have been based at Al-Ansar in Saudi Arabia.

Career

Sierra Leone

In 1993, he was appointed manager of Sierra Leone.

Assisted by Sam Obi Metzger, Zarpanelian guided Sierra Leone to a 0-4 defeat to Ivory Coast and a 0-0 stalemate with Zambia at the 1994 Africa Cup of Nations, causing him to step down as coach and go back to Paris.

Burkina Faso
Working with ASFA Yennenga in early 1997, the Franco-Armenian took charge of ASF Bobo Dioulasso by summer of that year, driving them to a runners-up position in the league and a national cup trophy.

Uganda
Visited Uganda with French journalist Frank Simon to watch the 2000 CECAFA Cup and observe East African football.

Death
Diagnosed with kidney cancer, Zarpanelian died at a hospital in Paris at the age of 78 in 2011 and was buried on the 6th of April. Previously, he was linked with the Central African Republic technical director position. The Raymond Zarpanelian Trophy was launched in 2014 to honor an African-based French football technician each year, with Pascal Janin getting the award for his achievements with Stade Malien.

Personal life
The former Sierra Leone mentor was said to have been a magnanimous person.

References

French Wikipedia Page

French football managers
French people of Armenian descent
Expatriate football managers in Burkina Faso
Expatriate football managers in Saudi Arabia
Sportspeople from Paris
Sierra Leone national football team managers
French expatriate football managers
Expatriate football managers in Sierra Leone
Al-Ansar F.C. managers
French expatriate sportspeople in Saudi Arabia
1933 births
2011 deaths
ASF Bobo Dioulasso managers